Dennis Anthony Thomas (born 26 March 1962), better known as King Kong, is a Jamaican deejay/singer best known for his work in the 1980s.

Biography
Born in Kingston, Thomas first recorded as a deejay at Tuff Gong studios in 1982, initially working under the name Junior Kong, named after his father. His debut single was "Pink Eye". He worked with GT and then his own Love Bunch sound system and then recorded for King Tubby's Firehouse label, now singing in a similar style to Tenor Saw. The early King Kong recordings for Tubby were over early digital rhythms, and included songs such as "AIDS" and "Babylon", and established him as a popular artist. His first album release was split with another of Tubby's singers, Anthony Red Rose, with Two Big Bull Inna One Pen issued on Firehouse. During 1986 and 1987, Kong recorded for several of Jamaica's top producers, including Prince Jammy, with whom he enjoyed his biggest hits with "Trouble Again" (the title track from his Jammy-produced debut album proper) and "Legal We Legal", Black Scorpio, Harry J, Errol Thompson, Ossie Hibbert, Bunny Lee, and Prince Jazzbo. While many of his songs were typical in content of the era, several of his songs had political and cultural themes. He released several albums during this period before relocating first to New York, and then to Canada in the late 1980s, where he released material occasionally on his Conscious Music label. The death of Tenor Saw in 1988 prompted King Kong to release "He Was a Friend" as a tribute, and in 1989 he relocated to England and recorded with Mafia & Fluxy and Gussie P in the early 1990s. He began recording more regularly again in the 2000s.

Discography

Albums
Trouble Again (10 November 1986), Greensleeves
Two Big Bull Inna One Pen (1986), Firehouse – with Anthony Red Rose
Legal We Legal (1986), Jammy's – issued in the UK as Trouble Again on Greensleeves Records, reissued (2008), Greensleeves with bonus tracks
Dancehall Session (1986), Striker Lee
Musical Confrontation (1986), Jammy's – with Nitty Gritty
Big Heavy Load (1987), Striker Lee
Identify Me (1987), Black Solidarity
Musical Terrorist (198?), Our Land Sound Productions
Rumble Jumble Life (2005), Massive B
Ethiopian Dream (2012), (King Shiloh)

Singles
"You Pack up and gone" (1986), Jammy´s
"Can´t Ride Computer" (1986), Jammy´s – Riddim : Tempo
"Pink Eye" (1982), 56 Hope Road
"Sensimania Is Walking" (1985), R:E:M
"Ninja" (1985), Sunset
"AIDS" (1986), Firehouse
"Babylon" (1986), Firehouse
"Trouble Again" (1986), Greensleeves/Jammy's
"Mix Up" (1986)
"Legal We Legal" (1986), Greensleeves
"Paro Them Paro" (1986), Greensleeves
"Have Some Approach" (198?), Black Solidarity
"Niceness" (1986), Black Scorpio
"Identify Me" (198?), Black Scorpio
"Rich & Switch" (1986), Java
"Rip and Run Off" (1986), Big M
"Nice Christmas" (198?), Firehouse
"Step on My Corn" (198?), Firehouse
"No Call Me No Boops" (198?), Firehouse
"Don't Touch My Boops" (1986), Jammy's
"Big Boy" (1986), Oneness
"Rocky Road" (1986), Fresh Roses
"Good Fi Nuttin" (198?), Firehouse
"Girls Dem A Come" (198?), Ujama
"Raggamuffin A Pass" (1986), Ujama
"Can't Distress Me" (198?), Parish
"Toots Boops" (1987)
"Eden a Come" (1987), Black Scorpio
"Can't Tan It" (1987), Sunset
"Musical Terrorist" (1987), Sunset
"Time Is The Master" (1987), Upsetter Music
"Reggae Mylitis" (198?), Sunset
"No Touch De Gorilla" (1987)
"Over Cover Lover" (198?), Live & Love
"Dollars Strong" (198?), MCM
"Highest Grade" (198?), Black Scorpio
"Ragamuffin A Pass" (198?), Now Generation
"Predominent" (198?), Now Generation
"Du No Get High" (198?), Ottey's
"Song of Love" (198?), Pisces
"Don't Trouble Trouble" (198?), Striker Lee
"Glamour Boy in Mi Life" (198?), Striker Lee
"Must Work On Sunday" (198?), Striker Lee
"Moving On African Border" (198?), Striker Lee
"Four Year Old" (198?), Apple Tree
"Job" (198?), Apple Tree
"Here I Am" (19??), Bugu B
"Agony And Pain" (198?), Jah Life Time
"He Was a Friend" (1988), Conscious Music
"Magic Moment" (1989), Taurus
"Identify Me" (19??), Digikal
"Digital We Digital" (19??), Digikal
"Break Down The Walls" (????), Jammy's
"Jah Jah Rule" (19??), Thompson Sound
"Who Say" (19??), Thompson Sound
"Dem A Fake" (????), Jammy's
"Imagine" (????), Jammy's
"Seize All Guns" (????), Jammy's
"Try Not I" (19??)
"Once Upon A Time" (198?), King Kong – with Leroy Mafia
"Progress" (198?), Thunderbolt
"Not A Bwoy Caan Test We" (1991), Gussie P
"Trouble Again Pt. 2" (199?), Jammy's
"Unity Medley" (19??), Massive Sounds – with Anthony B and Burro Banton
"Unfortunate Children" (????), Ffrench
"Have A Little Sound" (????), Sinbad
"Bag Juice & Cheese Chips" (199?), Massive B
"Call Mr. Madden" (1995), Massive B
"Earth Is The Lord" (????), Massive B
"Ethiopia" (????), Massive B
"Free Speech" (????), Massive B
"Legalize It" (????), Massive B
"Troubles" (????), Massive B
"Unity" (????), Massive B
"Seem Dem There" (????), Reggae Explorer
"My Darling" (1998), Jammy's
"Works of Jah" (2001), Roots Foundation
"Jah Is My Best Friend" (2002), Massive B
"Big Money Pay" (200?), Badd
"Big Bad Sound" (200?), Sweet Beat
"Paradise Lost" (2004), Massive B
"Higher High" (2004), Conscious Music
"African Border" (2005), Flash
"Rumble Jumble Life" (2005), Massive B
"Free De Herb" (2005), Inkalink
"1922" (2005), Rashanco
"Who Say" (2005), Thompson Sound
"I Feel A Joy" (2005), Massive B
"Evolution" (2006), Jahspora
"Dem Nah Do Nuttun" (2006), Run Things
"This Train" (2006), Diop Side
"Jah is the Ruler" (200?), Koogah Sound
"Flirt" (2008), Phantom
"Not A Bwoy Caan Test We" (2008), Sip a Cup
"Mi Ave A Likkle Sound" (2008), Sip a Cup
"Missin Africa" (2009), Massive B
"Chosen One" (2009), Uplift – B-side of Lutan Fyah's "Babylon a Fiss"

References

Living people
Musicians from Kingston, Jamaica
Jamaican reggae singers
1962 births
Greensleeves Records artists
Firehouse 12 Records artists